Eurovision – Australia Decides was an annual song competition organised by Australian public broadcaster Special Broadcasting Service (SBS) and production partner Blink TV.

Background
This invitation has been extended each year and Australia is invited to participate in the contest until at least 2023.

The entrants from 2015 until 2018 were internally selected. In September 2018, SBS announced that from 2019, it would organise a national contest to select the artist and the song that will compete at the 2019 Eurovision Song Contest and placed a call for entries. The show was to be called Eurovision – Australia Decides.

Format
SBS asks for submissions, then selects ten entries and their running order for the contest. The contest takes place over a weekend in February, with a jury preview show, a matinee preview show and a live final. The winner is determined via the combination of public televote (50%) and the votes of a professional jury panel (50%).

Contestants

Winners

Notes

References 

2019 Australian television series debuts
Eurovision Song Contest selection events
Music competitions in Australia
Recurring events established in 2019
Singing competitions
Australian music television series
2010s Australian reality television series
February events
Music festivals established in 2019
2020s Australian reality television series